Aaron Glenn Miller (born June 14, 1987) is an American politician and educator who served as a member of the Michigan House of Representatives from 2015 to 2021.

Early life and education 
Miller was born in Sturgis, Michigan. He earned a Bachelor of Arts degree in secondary education and political science from Western Michigan University and a Master of Education from Bethel College.

Career 
Before being elected to the Michigan Legislature, Miller worked as a middle and high school mathematics teacher. Miller was elected to the Michigan House of Representatives in November 2014 and assumed office on January 1, 2015. During the 2019–2020 legislative session, Miller served as vice chair of the House Appropriations Committee. He was unable to seek re-election in 2020 due to term limits.

Personal life 
Miller is a Follower of Christ, and attends the Grace Christian Fellowship in Sturgis, Michigan.

References

External links 
 Aaron Miller at gophouse.org
 Aaron Miller at votesmart.org
 Aaron Miller at ballotpedia.org

1987 births
Living people
Western Michigan University alumni
Bethel College (Indiana) alumni
Republican Party members of the Michigan House of Representatives
People from St. Joseph County, Michigan
21st-century American politicians
People from Sturgis, Michigan